Victor A. Yap (born March 5) is a Filipino politician who is currently serving as a member of the House of Representatives of the Philippines, representing the 2nd district of Tarlac. He also sits as Chairman of the House Committee on Information and Communications Technology. He previously served as Governor of Tarlac.

Biography 
Yap studied at Ateneo de Manila University and University of the Philippines, obtaining a master’s degree in Strategic Studies. 

Yap served as vice mayor of Victoria, Tarlac, from 1988 to 1998. In 1999, he was named to the board of directors of the Clark Development Corporation.

He was executive assistant to the governor of Tarlac from 2001, and was elected governor in 2007.

Yap is the son of former Governor Jose “Aping” Yap Sr. and brother of current Tarlac Governor of Susan Yap. He is a member of Upsilon Sigma Phi.

References 

Year of birth missing (living people)
Living people
21st-century Filipino politicians
University of the Philippines alumni
Politicians from Tarlac
Governors of Tarlac